Maurice Benard (born March 1, 1963) is an American actor. In 1993, he was cast as Sonny Corinthos on the ABC soap opera General Hospital.

Early life and career
Benard was born Mauricio José Morales in Martinez, California, the son of Martha, a bank employee, and Humberto Morales, a bakery superintendent. He grew up in San Francisco, California, and is of Nicaraguan ancestry.

He started his acting career as Nico on the soap opera All My Children, from 1987 to 1990.

He then began appearing on General Hospital, a daytime soap opera on ABC. His role on the show was the fictional Sonny Corinthos, a manic depressive mobster King pin. His first air date on GH was August 13, 1993. Benard has been nominated for several Daytime Emmy awards for his role of Sonny Corinthos,winning Outstanding Lead Actor in 2003, 2019, and 2021, as well as winning three Soap Opera Digest Awards for Outstanding Lead Actor in 1996, 2003, and 2005.

In addition to guest spots on several television series during the early 1990s, Benard appeared in television movies including the CBS television movie Lucy & Desi: Before the Laughter (1991), in which he portrayed Desi Arnaz. He also starred in the independent film The Ghost and the Whale, executive produced by his wife Paula.

Personal life
Benard married Paula Smith on August 11, 1990. They have four children: three daughters and one son. He and his wife adopted his wife's younger sister Heather, after their mother's death.

His cousin, Marvin Benard, played professional baseball.

Benard was diagnosed with bipolar disorder at age 22. He has become a spokesperson for treatment of the disorder with Mental Health America. He made the decision to have the General Hospital writers make his character, Sonny Corinthos, also have the disorder. Many of the struggles he faces on the show due to the disorder are ones he faced in his own life. Much praise has been given to the show for the realistic depiction.

Filmography

Awards and nominations

References

External links
 

1963 births
Living people
20th-century American male actors
21st-century American male actors
American people of Nicaraguan descent
American people of Salvadoran descent
Hispanic and Latino American male actors
American male film actors
American male television actors
American male soap opera actors
Daytime Emmy Award winners
Daytime Emmy Award for Outstanding Lead Actor in a Drama Series winners
Male actors from San Francisco
People from Temecula, California
People with bipolar disorder
Fictional teenage parents